The Anderson College Historic District is a historic district on the campus of Anderson University in Anderson, South Carolina. The district was listed on the National Register of Historic Places in 1998.

The Anderson College Historic District includes the following Anderson University buildings/areas:
 The main entrance (Boulevard)
 Merritt Administration Building
 Denmark Hall
 West Loggia
 East Loggia
 Pratt Hall
 Vandiver Hall
 The Pratt and Vandiver Hall connecter
 The Lodge
 Lastly, all of the university grounds

External links
 Official website for Anderson University

References

University and college buildings on the National Register of Historic Places in South Carolina
Historic districts on the National Register of Historic Places in South Carolina
Buildings and structures in Anderson County, South Carolina
National Register of Historic Places in Anderson County, South Carolina